Harry Gittes (May 6, 1936 - September 2, 2017) was an American film producer.  He was known for collaborating with Jack Nicholson in such films as Drive, He Said (1971), Goin' South (1978) and About Schmidt (2002).  Gittes was also the namesake of Nicholson's character in Chinatown (1974).

Early life and education
Gittes was born on May 6, 1936 in Brookline, Massachusetts.  He attended the University of Massachusetts at Amherst.

Personal life and death
Gittes was married to lawyer Christine Cuddy and they had two children: Michael and Julia.

Gittes died of natural causes on September 2, 2017 in Los Angeles at age 81.

Filmography

References

External links
 

1936 births
2017 deaths
People from Brookline, Massachusetts
American film producers
University of Massachusetts Amherst alumni
Film producers from Massachusetts